Capitán General Carlos Morphi was an Irish Lt. Colonel who worked for Spain. He became the Colonial governor of Paraguay in 1766. He had good relations with the Jesuits. He was also, in 1770, the founder of Eusebio Ayala, Paraguay.

References 

Governors of Paraguay
Irish emigrants to Paraguay
Spanish city founders
18th-century politicians